Staxigoe is a former fishing village, located 2 miles east of Wick on the north-eastern coast of the former county of Caithness, Scottish Highlands and is in the Scottish council area of Highland. Its name derives from Norse, "the inlet of the stack". It was once the largest herring salting station in Europe, but its fishing industry went into decline with the construction of a larger port in central Wick.

References

External links
 Staxigoe

Populated places in Caithness
Ports and harbours of Scotland